Stellate, meaning star-shaped, may refer to:

 Stellate cell
 Stellate ganglion 
 Stellate reticulum
 Stellate veins
 Stellate trichomes (hairs) on plants
 Stellate laceration or incision Wound#Open
 Stellate fan-shaped Espalier (one form of a pruned shape of a Tree). See: Fruit tree forms or Tree shaping#Espalier